Alfredo Belusi (born Alfredo Belluschi, Los Quirquinchos, Santa Fe, 10 January 1925 - Buenos Aires, 1 January 2001) was an Argentine tango musician. His works at José Basso's and Osvaldo Pugliese's Orchestras were notable, including songs 'Bronca', 'Se tiran conmigo', 'De puro curda' and 'Y no le erré'. He died from stroke in 2001.

External links
  Alfredo Belusi on todotango.com
 Alfredo Belusi on Tango.info

1925 births
2001 deaths
People from Caseros Department
Tango singers
20th-century Argentine male singers
Orquesta Osvaldo Pugliese